Meranoplus levis, is a species of ant of the subfamily Myrmicinae. It is found in Sri Lanka, and India.

References

External links
 at antwiki.org
Animaldiversity.org

Myrmicinae
Hymenoptera of Asia
Insects described in 1942